Adolph Milar (1895–1950) was a Swiss-born film actor. He appeared in character roles in around sixty American films from 1919 to 1945, playing characters of a variety of nationalities. His name is sometimes written as  Adolf Milar.

Selected filmography

 The Black Circle (1919)
 Something Different (1920)
 The Road of Ambition (1920)
 The Silent Barrier (1920)
 The Girl from Porcupine (1921)
 My Friend the Devil (1922)
 Enemies of Women (1923)
 Fury (1923)
 Backbone (1923)
 Love's Wilderness (1924)
 Marriage in Transit (1925)
 Back to God's Country (1927)
 Uncle Tom's Cabin (1927)
 Clothes Make the Woman (1928)
 The Michigan Kid (1928)
 The Devil's Skipper (1928)
 The Gateway of the Moon (1928)
 Bulldog Drummond (1929)
 Call of the Flesh (1930)
 Isle of Escape (1930)
 The Medicine Man (1930)
 Rain or Shine (1930)
 Honeymoon Lane (1931)
 Platinum Blonde (1931)
 The Savage Girl (1932)
 Sons of Steel (1934)
 The Great Impersonation (1935)
 Revolt of the Zombies (1936)
 So Ends Our Night (1941)
 Paris Calling (1941)

References

Bibliography
 Biskupski, M.B.B. Hollywood's War with Poland, 1939-1945. University Press of Kentucky, 2011. 
 Pitts, Michael R. Poverty Row Studios, 1929–1940: An Illustrated History of 55 Independent Film Companies, with a Filmography for Each. McFarland & Company, 2005.

External links

1895 births
1950 deaths
Swiss emigrants to the United States
Swiss male film actors
People from Davos